Stigmella auromarginella is a moth of the family Nepticulidae. It is found from Sweden to Portugal, Crete and Cyprus and from Ireland to Croatia. It is much more common in the southern part of the range.

The wingspan is 3–5 mm. Head ferruginous - orange. Antennal eyecaps ochreous-whitish. Forewings deep shining golden-bronze ; a shining golden -silvery fascia beyond middle, edged anteriorly with purple suffusion, apical area beyond this deep purple ; an apical shining golden -silvery fascia, partly in cilia. Hindwings grey.

Adults are on wing from June to August and from September to November.

The larvae feed on Agrimonia, Rubus fruticosus, Rubus sanctus and Rubus ulmifolius. They mine the leaves of their host plant. The mine consists of an unusually short corridor with a central line of frass that is irregularly interrupted. Pupation takes place outside the mine.

References

External links
bladmineerders.nl
Swedish Moths
Fauna Europaea
 Stigmella auromarginella images at  Consortium for the Barcode of Life

Nepticulidae
Moths of Europe
Moths described in 1890